Farewell (German: Abschied) is a 1930 German comedy drama film directed by Robert Siodmak and starring Brigitte Horney, Aribert Mog and Emilia Unda.

It was shot at the Babelsberg Studios in Berlin. The film's sets were designed by the art director Max Knaake.

Plot
Peter Winkler and his fiancee Hella live together in Berlin, in a guesthouse called "Splendide", run by Mrs Weber. Peter and Hella seem to be the only happy people in the house, all others are misfits of various kinds. One day, Peter is offered a well paid position in Dresden. He is hoping that with greater professional success he will finally be able to marry Hella. In this joyful mood he tells the other guests about the news, but not Hella, who he wants to surprise. Unfortunately some of the guests can't keep a secret and so Hella learns of the news. She in turn doesn't tell Peter that she already had a dress and a hat reserved in a local store, without owning the required amount of money. In this difficult situation she borrowed the money from another male guest at the guesthouse. While Hella is picking up her stuff at the store, Peter learns that Hella borrowed the money and thinks she cheated on him. Without waiting for her return, he leaves the guesthouse, never to come back.

Cast
 Brigitte Horney as Hella, retailer
 Aribert Mog as Peter Winkler, traveling salesman
 Emilia Unda as Mrs. Weber
 Konstantin Mic as  Bogdanoff
 Frank Günther as  Neumann, master of ceremonies
 Erwin Bootz as Himself
 Martha Ziegler as Lina, maid-servant
 Vladimir Sokoloff as The Baron
 Esmée Symon as 1st Lennox-Sister
 Gisela Draeger as 2nd Lennox-Sister
 Marianne Mosner as 3rd Lennox-Sister
 Georg Nikolai
 Erwin Splettstößer
 Bruno Hoenscherle
 Daisy Rensburg

Release
The film premiered on 25 August 1930 in Berlin.

External links 
 

1930 films
Films of the Weimar Republic
1930s German-language films
German black-and-white films
Films directed by Robert Siodmak
UFA GmbH films
1930s romantic comedy-drama films
German romantic comedy-drama films
Films shot at Babelsberg Studios
German comedy-drama films
1930 comedy films
1930 drama films
1930s German films